Imperial Noble Consort Sunheon of the Yeongwol Eom clan (2 February 1854 – 20 July 1911) (순헌황귀비 엄씨) was a consort of the Korean king and emperor Gojong. She was given the posthumous title of Sunheon Hwang-Gwi-bi "Sunheon, Imperial Concubine of the Highest Rank". Her personal name was Eom Seon-yeong (엄선영, 嚴善英).

Life

Early life 
Eom Seon-yeong was born into the Yeongwol Eom clan on 2 February 1854 to Eom Jin-sam and his wife, Lady Park of the Miryang Park clan. She was the eldest daughter and third child of five children. Her father served as an officer at Changdeok Palace during the early years of King Gojong's reign.

Eom was a household servant until she entered the palace at the age of 8 in January 1861. She was assigned to serve as a court lady within Gyeongbok Palace.

Because her older brothers had died while young, her father had no heir to carry on his lineage. Her cousin Eom Jun-won, the second son of her father's older brother Eom Jin-il, was adopted by her father. Eom Jun-won himself had to adopt a son from within their clan.

Palace life 
During the Imo Incident of 1882 which forced Queen Min (posthumously known as Empress Myeongseong) to flee from the palace, Eom demonstrated extreme loyalty to Gojong. She was rewarded with a promotion to the 5th rank of Gunggwan (the highest rank for court ladies). Her new position Jimil Sanggung (지밀상궁), also known as Daeryeong Sanggung (대령상궁), was responsible for attending to King the king, the queen, the queen dowager, and the royal concubines. They received direct orders from the person they served as they were regarded as the royal family's hands and feet.

Eom and the king became close during that time until Queen Min returned to the palace. In 1885, the Queen consort expelled Eom from the palace when she discovered Eom wearing Gojong's clothing (seung-eun) at the age of 32. Her expulsion stripped her of her position and title, but a high-ranking official, Yun Yong-seon, purportedly interceded on her behalf with Gojong, and she was forgiven. Eom never forgot the grace of Yun Yong-seon.

When Queen Min was assassinated in October 1897, Eom returned to the palace and became the king's favored concubine.

When she was in Agwanpacheon, she attended King Gojong and lived together at the Russian legation where the King and Crown Prince had fled after Queen Min's death.

In 1897, she gave birth to Prince Uimin, and two days later, she officially became a consort of the king. Eom later received the rank of Royal Noble Consort Sun in 1900, and then as Consort Sun in 1901. At the time, the word “gyebi” (계비), or the title held for the second Queen Consort of a King, was used and referred to the second officially revised palace. But it wasn't the proper title for Consort Sun, which was the equivalent in position and rank as an Empress.

When Gojong established the Korean Empire in 1897, she was later given the royal title of “Sunheon, Imperial Noble Consort of the Highest Rank” (Hwang Gwi-bi) in 1903 after giving birth to Yi Un, Crown Prince Uimin.

Her rank as consort became an issue when Gojong then chose Eom to be his new Empress as a replacement for Empress Myeongseong's vacant position and attempts to elevate Eom to Empress. Right after his exile in Japan, Yi Jun-yong, the king's nephew, opposed the idea of Eom to be Empress. This leads to him informing Koreans in exile and prepares for an opposition movement.

In April 1899, Yi Jun-yong joined the campaign against Eom's reprimand against the Japanese asylum seekers. As a result of discussions with Yu Gil-jun, Kwon Dong-jin, Jo Jung-eung Cho, and two or three others, he resolved to oppose Eom's position to the Empress. Yi stated that it would jeopardize the country to make Eom an Empress and decided to send a letter of advice to Lee Jae-soon, the Minister of the Palace. Yi Jun-yong objected to Eom becoming Empress, saying it was a matter related to the prestige of the royal family because of the Eom's origins prior to becoming a palace lady.

In addition, Yi Jun-yong sent a letter to his father (Emperor Gojong's older brother), King Heungchin, and prayed to rebuke Eom as the empress in order to gain the emperor's favor with the emperor. It was said that Yi Jun-yong actively campaigned against Eom's rebuke to the position of Empress because Eom rejected Yi Jun-yong and Yi Kang, his son, who were in exile in Japan for the succession of power to his son, Hwang Yi-eun. However, in this situation, Yi Jun-yong's movement against Eom was forced to act as a threat to his personal affairs.

Eom and her supporters told Gojong that Yi Jun-yong had a change of heart and mind, and Gojong, who believed that Yi Jun-yong was involved in the assassination of Empress Myeongseong, decided to remove Yi Jun-yong from his positions.

Due to the death of Crown Princess Min in 1907, and remembering the help she received from Yun, she recommended his adoptive great-granddaughter, Yun Jeung-sun (the future Empress Sunjeong) to be the second wife of Crown Prince Sunjong.

Because Sunjong had no son and was severely ill due to the Coffee Poisoning Plot, the Imperial Consort started planning to raise her son, Prince Uimin, as the next Crown Prince. However, as Yi Kang figured out her plan, he opposed her and became in conflict with him.

On August 17, 1907, Emperor King Gojong, decided to be the prince of obedience without any heirs. This was the result of Yi Jun-yong, who continued to threaten his throne, and Gojong's intention to contain Yi Kang, and Yi Wan-yong, who feared that his real power would be eroded if Yi Jun-yong and Lee Kang-pa gain power. As a result, Yi Jun-yong, who has been constantly receiving treatment, attention, and checks as a potential successor to the throne during long-term exiles, becomes the cousin of Sunjong, and Yi Kang becoming the uncle of the prince.

Eom eventually succeeded in making her son the successor of Emperor Sunjong, but Crown Prince Uimin was taken by Ito Hirobumi to Japan under the pretense to raise him instead. When she went to see her son, she stated that she saw her son eating lunch with rice balls while he was undergoing a hard training at a Japanese academy.

Later Years 
Eom later founded Yang Jeongsuk (now Yangchung High School) in 1905, and Jinmyeong Girls' School (now Jinmyeong Girls' High School) and Myeongshin Girls' School (now Sookmyeong Women's University) in 1906.

She later suffered from typhoid in July 1911, and eventually passed away a few days later on July 20 at the age of 57 at Hamnyeong Hall (咸寧殿) in Deoksugung Palace. At the time, her son, Crown Prince Uimin, was staying in Japan and wasn't told about her death until later.

After her death, Eom was given the title of 'Sunheon', a title that was given from Sunjong.

She is buried in Cheonsu Mountain in Yangju, and Myoho was called Yeonghuiwon. She was later re-buried across from her mausoleum with Yi Jin, her eldest grandson, who she had not seen him in her lifetime, who died from poisoning.

Her tablets were additionally enclosed in Chilgung.

Family
 Great-Great-Grandfather
 Eom Gye-eung (엄계응, 嚴啓膺) (1737 - 1816)
 Great-Grandfather 
 Eom Seong-bok (엄성복, 嚴性復)
 Grandfather 
 Eom Jae-woo (엄재우, 嚴載祐)
 Grandmother 
 Lady Yeon of the Goksan Yeon clan (곡산 연씨)
 Father
 Eom Jin-sam (엄진삼, 嚴眞三) (9 October 1812 - 28 July 1879)
 Uncle: Eom Jin-il (엄진일, 嚴鎭一)
 Aunt: Lady Heo of the Yangcheon Heo clan (양천 허씨)
 Cousin: Eom Jun-won (엄준원, 嚴俊源) (1855 - 13 February 1938); became the adoptive son of Eom Jin-sam 
 Cousin: Eom Chung-won (엄충원, 嚴忠源)
 Uncle: Eom Jin-oh (엄진오, 嚴鎭五)
 Mother 
 Lady Park of the Miryang Park clan (밀양 박씨) (1824 - 1895)
 Siblings
 Older brother: Eom Bong-won (엄봉원, 嚴鳳源)
 Adoptive nephew: Eom Ju-myeong (엄주명, 嚴柱明) (19 November 1896 - 6 February 1976)
 Older brother: Eom Hak-won (엄학원, 嚴鶴源); died prematurely 
 Adoptive younger brother: Eom Jun-won (엄준원, 嚴俊源) (1855 - 13 February 1938)
 Adoptive sister-in-law: Lady Jang of the Indong Jang clan (인동 장씨)
 Adoptive nephew: Eom Ju-myeong (엄주명, 嚴柱明) (19 November 1896 - 6 February 1976); became the adoptive son of Eom Bong-won
 Adoptive grandnephew: Eom Yeong-seop (엄영섭, 嚴英燮)
 Adoptive grandnephew: Eom (엄종섭, 嚴宗燮)
 Adoptive grandnephew: (엄항섭, 嚴恒燮)
 Adoptive grandnephew: (엄정섭, 嚴貞燮) (1920 - 21 February 1995)
 Adoptive niece: Lady Eom of the Yeongwol Eom clan (영월 엄씨)
 Adoptive nephew-in-law: Park Gi-hong (박기홍, 朴基洪) (1845 - ?)
 Adoptive niece: Eom Chae-deok (엄채덕, 嚴彩德), Lady Eom of the Yeongwol Eom clan (영월 엄씨) (1889 - ?)
 Adoptive nephew-in-law: Min Won-sik (민원식, 閔元植) (12 July 1886 - 16 February 1921)
 Adoptive grandnephew: Min Byeong-seong (민병성, 閔丙星)
 Younger sister: Lady Eom of the Yeongwol Eom clan (영월 엄씨)
 Brother-in-law: Lee Yong-se (이용세, 李容世)
 Husband
 Emperor Gojong of Korea (고종황제) (8 September 1952 - 21 January 1919)
 Son
 Yi Eun, Crown Prince Uimin (20 October 1897 – 1 May 1970) (이은 의민태자) 
 Daughter-in-law: Princess Masako Nashimoto of Japan, Crown Princess Euimin (의민황태자비) (4 November 1901 - 30 April 1989)
 Grandson: Yi Jin (이진, 李晉) (18 August 1921 - 11 May 1922)
 Grandson: Yi Gu (이구, 李玖) (29 September 1931 - 16 July 2005)
 Granddaughter-in-law: Julia Mullock (18 March 1923 - 26 November 2017)
 Great-granddaughter: Yi Eunsuk (이은숙, 李恩淑) or Eugenia Unsuk (1959 - )
 Adoptive great-grandson: Yi Won (이원, 李源) (23 September 1962 - )
 Granddaughter-in-law: Arita Kinoko (아리타 키누코) or Yi Gyeon-ja (이견자, 李絹子)

Popular Culture

Drama 
 Portrayed by Kim Eun-jeong and Shin So-min in the 1990 MBC TV series Grand Internal Prince
 Portrayed by Oh Ji-yeong in the 1995 KBS1 TV series Dazzling Dawn
 Portrayed by Seo Mi-ae in the 2001-2002 KBS2 TV series Empress Myeongseong
 Portrayed by Kim Ja-ok in the 2002 MBC TV series 너희가 나라를 아느냐
 Portrayed by Kim Ju-ryeong in the 2018 tvN TV series Mr. Sunshine

Film 
 Portrayed by Eom Aeng-ran in the 1959 film Independence Association and young Rhee Syung-Man
 Portrayed by Eom Aeng-ran in the 1964 film The Sino-Japanese War and Queen Min the Heroine

See also
Yangchung High School:School founded by her sponsorship

References 

1854 births
1911 deaths
Royal consorts of the Joseon dynasty
Korean queens consort